The Hendregadredd Manuscript, is a medieval Welsh manuscript containing an anthology of the poetry of the "Poets of the Princes" (Gogynfeirdd); it was written between 1282 and 1350. 

The manuscript was long part of the library at Hengwrt, assembled by the antiquary Robert Vaughan (d.1667). A catalogue of the library made in the early 1800s failed to find the manuscript, it having likely been taken in 1778 by the Anglican priest and scholar Richard Thomas (1753–80), who is notorious for removing important medieval manuscripts from libraries and not returning them.

The manuscript then disappeared for over a century. It was unexpectedly rediscovered in 1910 in a cupboard in a disused bedroom of the mansion of Hendregadredd near Porthmadog: a note found inside, written by the Archdeacon of Merioneth, Richard Newcombe (1779-1857), stated "I have long been in possession of this Welsh MS. but forget where or how I obtained it". It is now part of the collection of the National Library of Wales with catalogue number NLW MS 6680B.

The manuscript is the earliest witness of the works of the Gogynfeirdd, the Welsh court poets who were active from the early 12th century until the 14th century. It is especially valuable as the only other major source of their work is the Red Book of Hergest. The Hendregadredd Manuscript was probably written at the Cistercian abbey of Strata Florida in Ceredigion. Work began on this collection of poetry sometime after 1282 - first by one main scribe, perhaps the original architect of the volume - but nearly forty different hands were involved in two further strata of scribal activity, working well into the mid-14th century. About 1330 a number of poems by contemporary poets were added, including a poem possibly in the hand of Dafydd ap Gwilym himself, the most famous poet of the day. He had close associations with Strata Florida and tradition has it that he was buried there.

Parts of the Hendregadredd Manuscript were copied in 1617 by the scholar John Davies (Mallwyd). Early copies of sections of the manuscript show that some portions of the original have since been lost.

References

External links
The Hendregadredd Manuscript at the National Library of Wales. Includes full colour images of the complete manuscript.

14th-century books
Welsh manuscripts
Medieval Welsh literature
Welsh poetry
Welsh-language literature
National Library of Wales collections